Leif Kayser (13 June 1919, in Copenhagen – 15 June 2001) was a Danish composer and organist.

He was the son of geographer Olaf Ivar Monrad Kayser (1893–1928) and Hedwig Martha Nick (1877–1972).

Kayser began studies at the Royal Danish Academy of Music in 1936, where he was a student of Poul Schierbeck. In Stockholm, he studied composition with Hilding Rosenberg and orchestral conducting with Thurs Mann. Kayser debuted 1941 as pianist in Copenhagen and as conductor in Gothenburg.

After theological studies in Rome, Kayser was ordained in 1949 and served as pastor and organist of St. Ansgar Roman Catholic cathedral in Copenhagen until 1964, after which he was employed as a teacher of instrumentation and score analysis at the Royal Danish Academy of Music.

Works
Kayser was one of the leading Danish organ composers of the 20th century. Among his major works for the instrument are four suites and the big Concerto per Organo from 1965.

Organ Music
 3 Improvisazioni
 Paraphrase of Gregorian motives
 Variations on "In dulci jubilo"
 Fantasia – Arabesco – Corale (1953–55)
 Sonatina
 Suite caratteristica (1956)
 Suite No. 2
 Suite No. 3
 Suite No. 4 (1973)
 Requiem, 11 meditazioni per organo
 Variazioni pasquali (1957–60)
 Concerto (1965)
 Christmas Hymn Games
 Sonata
 Fantasia e INNO (1969)
 Entrata real
 Church Windows
 Pezzi Sacri I / II
 Toccata sopra "Ave Maria"
 3 Maria frescoes (1979–82)
 2 pcs sinfonici
 Hymn to Duke Knud (1986)
 Lauda board salvatorem (1992)

References

Concert band composers
Danish classical composers
Danish male classical composers
Danish classical organists
Male classical organists
20th-century classical composers
Composers for pipe organ
Danish Roman Catholic priests
People from Copenhagen
1919 births
2001 deaths
20th-century organists
20th-century Danish male musicians
20th-century Roman Catholic priests